Prairie Creek Airport  is located next to Prairie Creek, Northwest Territories, Canada. Prior permission is required to land except in the case of an emergency. The airport is closed from 1 September until 30 April.

References

Registered aerodromes in the Dehcho Region